Marinisporobacter is a Gram-positive and endospore-forming bacterial genus from the family of Clostridiaceae with one known species (Marinisporobacter balticus).

References

Clostridiaceae
Bacteria genera
Monotypic bacteria genera
Taxa described in 2017